Mitiyala Wildlife Sanctuary also known as Mitiyala Grasslands is situated near Mitiyala in Gujarat. The jungle was a part of  erstwhile Bhavnagar princely state before independence of India in 1947. Mitiyala Wildlife Sanctuary occupies 18.22 km2 and its status was confirmed in 2004. It is home to almost 11 to 12 lions and leopards. Spotted deer and nilgai (blue bulls)  are also found in this wildlife sanctuary. Lions often meander down to Sasan Gir forest as this sanctuary shares a common boundary with the woodlands. The area between Gir and Mitiyala serves as passage connecting two habitat of wildlife.

References

Wildlife sanctuaries in Gujarat
Environment of Gujarat
Tourist attractions in Bhavnagar district
Protected areas established in 2004
2004 establishments in Gujarat